Zijlpoort may refer to:
Zijlpoort (Leiden)
Zijlpoort (Haarlem)